Mehmed Emin Âli Pasha, also spelled as Mehmed Emin Aali 5 (March 1815 – 7 September 1871) was a prominent Ottoman statesman during the Tanzimat period, best known as the architect of the Ottoman Reform Edict of 1856, and for his role in the Treaty of Paris (1856) that ended the Crimean War. Âli Pasha was widely regarded as a deft and able statesman, and often credited with preventing an early break-up of the empire.

Âli Pasha advocated for a western style of reform to modernize the empire, including secularization of the state and improvements to civil liberties. He worked to pacify nationalist movements while at the same time fend off foreign aggressors that were trying to weaken Ottoman control. He advocated for an Ottoman nationalism that would replace diverse ethnic and religious loyalties.

From humble origins as the son of a doorkeeper, Âli Pasha rose through the ranks of the Ottoman state and became the Minister of Foreign Affairs for a short time in 1840, and again in 1846. He became Grand Vizier for a few months in 1852, then again Foreign Minister in 1854. Between 1855 and 1871 he alternated between the two jobs, ultimately holding the position of Foreign Minister seven times and Grand Vizier five times in his lifetime. He was awarded the Order of the Red Eagle, 1st Class (for non-Christians) in 1851.

Early life
Mehmed Emin Âli Pasha was born on March 5, 1815, in Istanbul into a home of modest means. He was born the son of a shopkeeper, with no formal education except three years of primary school. It was in primary school that Ali Pasha learned to read and write in addition to memorizing some suras of the Koran. Nonetheless, Âli Pasha did continue to educate himself, including teaching himself French. He started his lengthy public serve career at the age of 14 as a clerk in the imperial council. The next year Âli Pasha was transferred to the records department of the Imperial Council. Once again Âli Pasha was transferred a year later, this time to the Translation Office.

Translation Office
The Translation Office (known in English as the office of the "dragoman" from the Turkish tercüme, "translation") was set up in response to Greek independence. This was due to the fact that, prior to Greek independence, many Greeks had acted as translators in government business. Consequently, the Greek uprising for independence resulted in an exodus of the Greek translators working for the government and left a demand for translators. In addition, internal affairs including, the defeat of Ottoman armies at the hand of the Egyptians and the Treaty of Hünkâr İskelesi with the Russians, diplomacy became more important. Such developments not only led to growth within the Translation office, but also to higher scrutiny of the Translation Office and it increased salaries. The job, however, didn't just improve Ali Paha's lot in life; it also impacted his future policies. For instance, Âli Pasha and others in the Translation Office, such as Âli Pasha's future partner in reform, Mehmed Fuad Pasha, got needed experience in the world of diplomacy through the work of translation in that very field. This exposure to the diplomatic realm distanced Mehmed Emin Âli Pasha from the values of traditional Ottoman society while at the same time developed within him the values of a rational bureaucrat.

Mustafa Reşid Pasha
In 1835 Âli Pasha was appointed second secretary to the Embassy in Vienna, where he studied the organization of the Austrian Empire. A few years later Âli Pasha found himself as counselor to Mustafa Reşid Pasha. Although, Mustafa Reşid Pasha was only ambassador to the Court of Saint James, better known as the royal court of Britain, he would be appointed Grand Vizier in 1839 and began a period of reform in the Ottoman Empire, known as the Tenzimat Reform. Mustafa left Ali Pasha in charge while he headed back to the Ottoman Empire to take his position as Grand Vizier. This development eventually would lead to Âli Pasha being made the official ambassador and he would continue to rise higher and higher in political office.

The Crimean War
In 1854 during the Crimean War Âli Pasha was recalled from retirement in order to take the portfolio of foreign affairs for a second time under Reshid Pasha and in this capacity took part in 1855 in the conference of Vienna. In 1855 he again became the Grand Vizier for one year, an office he filled no less than five times; in that role he represented the Porte at the Congress of Paris in 1856 and signed the peace treaty that ended the Crimean War.

Âli Pasha as an Ambassador

In 1846 Mehmed Emin Âli Pasha was made Minister of Foreign Affairs under Mustafa Pasha which is no surprise given his well honed skill in diplomacy. Sultan Abdülaziz, who often clashed with Âli Pasha over the powers of the Grand Vizier, admitted that he could not replace such a man so recognized in Europe. It was during his role as ambassador that Âli Pasha promoted friendship with England and France as well as incorporating western practices into the Ottoman Empire. For example, based on his experience of the education system of France, Âli Pasha laid the foundation of the prestigious Galatasaray High School in its modern form, where children of minority religions would be taught amongst Muslim students. This was done so that people of other religions would cease to see the Turks, as enemies. Âli Pasha's responsibilities and recognition increased further when he was chosen as lead delegate for the peace talks, while being appointed Grand Vizier again in the 1855 Congress of Vienna, following the Crimean war.  It was there that he formatted a peace settlement that included the Ottoman Empire into the Concert of Europe, a balance of power among European nations, and that the other powers of the Concert of Europe would respect the territories of the Ottoman Empire and its independence. Subsequently, it was altered somewhat and incorporated into Article seven of the 1856 treaty of Paris.

Edict of 1856

Although the intervention of England, France, and Sardinia in the Crimean War, in addition to the Treaty of Paris in 1856, saved the Ottoman Empire from Russia, the Ottoman Empire was now facing external pressure from its saviors to treat all their citizens equally regardless of religion. In response, Grand Vizier Âli Pasha formulated the Hatt-i Humayun reform edict of 1856. This promised equality to everyone in front of the law, opened civil offices to all subjects, guaranteed the security of life and property of non-Muslims and promised no one would be forced to change their religion. As a result, there was an increase of Christian missionaries in the Ottoman Empire. This created a concern that Muslims would convert to Christianity and get out of military service. In response to this fear, the Ottoman Empire ended up making a policy that conversion would not be allowed. In short, converts to Christianity could be arrested and punished.  The new freedoms also were unpopular with some non-Muslim members of the Ottoman population. Christian subjects, for instance, were angry for being put on the same level as Jews.

Âli Pasha versus the opposition
Âli Pasha constantly battled the sultan on the powers of the Grand Vezir during his time in office. He not only insisted that the sultan defer to him for ministerial appointments, but also secretaries and even attendants. Âli Pasha was also known to remove those with whom he disagreed politically, such as, the Young Ottomans. The Young Ottomans disagreed vehemently with the Tanzimat reform and saw it as pandering to the demands of Europe at the expense of sharia law. Ali Pasha, on the other hand, wanted the fusion of all subjects by providing equal opportunities in education and public office, with the end result being that Christians no longer would see themselves as oppressed by the Ottoman state, therefore leading to a more stable empire. This idea of fusion of Ottoman citizens was known as Ottomanism and the Young Ottomans did not share this view, expressing their views through media like newspapers. Although the opposition tactics of the Young Ottomans were within the boundaries of Istanbul censorship, Âli Pasha nonetheless closed down their newspapers and banished them.

Treatment of the Baha'is
See Baha'u'llah's letter to Âli Pasha here.

Death and legacy 

His close friend and fellow Tanzimat reformer was Fu'ad Pasha, who died in 1869 as the acting foreign minister. Upon his death, Âli Pasha took on the roles of both foreign minister and prime minister (grand vizier). Grieving over the death of Fu'ad Pasha, and with the added stress of enacting reforms by himself, Âli Pasha's health began to deteriorate. He was stricken with tuberculosis and died on 7 September 1871 after three months of illness, at the age of 56.

In response to his death, the Young Ottomans returned from exile, hoping to find a government more in line with their ideals. The Tanzimat period was terminated. The new Vezir, Mahmud Nedim Pasha, was an advocate of sultan absolutism, and the only thing he shared at all with the Young Ottomans was the belief of an Islamic character of the Ottoman Empire.

In 1910, a political testament of the deceased Âli Pasha was published. The document was written in 1871, just before his death, and was addressed to Sultan Abdülaziz. In it, he recounts his accomplishments such as keeping the Ottoman Empire intact, improving the bureaucracy, dealing with revolts with minor concessions, starting railroad construction and appeasement of European powers. He also mentions some failures on his part, such as the inadequate tax system, and goes on to give the sultan advice for the future. Such advice includes maintaining religious freedom, accepting non-Muslims into the armed forces and civil service, and improving the tax system by employing controlled companies to collect taxes. However, later research has cast serious doubt on the accuracy and authenticity of the testament. Aydogdu has shown that the testament was received as a hoax when it was first published in a newspaper in 1871 after Âli Pasha's death and it was not advocated by any of the Pasha's inheritors.

See also
List of Ottoman Grand Viziers
Islâhat Fermânı ( Islâhat Hatt-ı Hümâyûn-u, خط همايون) (18 February 1856)
Tanzimât ( تنظيمات ) Era (3 November 1839 - 22 November 1876)
Internationalization of the Danube River
Mehmed Rashid Pasha

Notes

References

External links

 

1815 births
1871 deaths
Politicians from Istanbul
Pashas
Ministers of Foreign Affairs of the Ottoman Empire
Ambassadors of the Ottoman Empire to the United Kingdom
19th-century Grand Viziers of the Ottoman Empire
Turks from the Ottoman Empire
19th-century diplomats
Reform in the Ottoman Empire